Ileana Gyulai-Drîmbă-Jenei (Hungarian: Ilona Gyulai, 12 June 1946 – 25 August 2021) was a Romanian foil fencer. She competed at the 1964, 1968, 1972, and 1976 Olympics and won team bronze medals in 1968 and 1972, placing fifth in 1964.

She was married to the fellow Olympic fencer Ion Drîmbă, but later divorced and married the association football player and coach Emerich Jenei; they had a daughter Cristina.

References

External links
 

1946 births
2021 deaths
Romanian female fencers
Romanian foil fencers
Olympic fencers of Romania
Fencers at the 1964 Summer Olympics
Fencers at the 1968 Summer Olympics
Fencers at the 1972 Summer Olympics
Fencers at the 1976 Summer Olympics
Olympic bronze medalists for Romania
Olympic medalists in fencing
Sportspeople from Cluj-Napoca
Medalists at the 1968 Summer Olympics
Medalists at the 1972 Summer Olympics